Rabih Jabr from the American University of Beirut, Lebanon was named Fellow of the Institute of Electrical and Electronics Engineers (IEEE) in 2016 for application of robust optimization to power systems.

References

Fellow Members of the IEEE
Living people
Year of birth missing (living people)
Place of birth missing (living people)
Academic staff of the American University of Beirut